The 2003–04 Mississippi State basketball team represented Mississippi State University as a member of the Southeastern Conference during the 2003–04 college basketball season. Under sixth-year head coach Rick Stansbury, the team played their home games at Humphrey Coliseum in Starkville, Mississippi. Mississippi State won the SEC West Division regular season title finishing six games ahead of LSU and Alabama. The Bulldogs were upset in the quarterfinal round of the SEC tournament, losing to Vanderbilt in overtime. The team received an at-large bid to the NCAA tournament as No. 2 seed in the Atlanta region. After an opening round win over No. 15 seed Monmouth, the Bulldogs were upset by No. 7 seed Xavier, a team they had beaten earlier in the season, 89–74.
Mississippi State finished the season with a record of 26–4 (14–2 SEC).

Roster

Schedule and results 

|-
!colspan=9 style=| Non-conference Regular season

|-
!colspan=9 style=| SEC Regular season

|-
!colspan=9 style=| SEC Tournament

|-
!colspan=9 style=| NCAA Tournament

Rankings

Awards and honors 
Lawrence Roberts – Consensus First-team All-American, SEC Player of the Year
Rick Stansbury – SEC Coach of the Year

References 

Mississippi State
Mississippi State Bulldogs men's basketball seasons
Mississippi State
Bull
Bull